The Muir Baronetcy, of Deanston in the County of Perth and of Park Gardens in the City of Glasgow, is a title in the Baronetage of the United Kingdom. It was created on 20 October 1892 for John Muir, Lord Provost of Glasgow from 1889 to 1892. The second Baronet served as high sheriff of County Waterford in 1919. The third Baronet was a deputy lieutenant of Perthshire. As of 2007 the presumed fourth Baronet has not successfully proven his succession and is therefore not on the Official Roll of the Baronetage, with the baronetcy considered dormant. He has also chosen not to use his title.

Muir baronets, of Deanston and Park Gardens, Glasgow (1892)

Sir John Muir, 1st Baronet (1828–1903) Lord Provost of Glasgow
Sir Alexander Kay Muir, 2nd Baronet (1868–1951)
Sir John Harling Muir, 3rd Baronet (1910–1994)
 Richard James Kay Muir, presumed 4th Baronet (born 1939)

The family are buried at Kincardine-in-Menteith on the road from Deanston to Stirling, just west of Blair Drummond.

References

Kidd, Charles, Williamson, David (editors). Debrett's Peerage and Baronetage (1990 edition). New York: St Martin's Press, 1990.

Baronetcies in the Baronetage of the United Kingdom